Miguel María Lasa Urquía (born 4 November 1947) is a Spanish former road bicycle racer. He was born in Oiartzun. He won four stages in the Vuelta a España as well as the Points classification in 1975 Vuelta a España. He also finished on the podium of Vuelta a España four times (1972, 1974, 1975, 1977). He also won two stages in the Tour de France and three stages in the Giro d'Italia.

He also competed in the individual road race and the team time trial events at the 1968 Summer Olympics.

Major results

1969
 1st Prueba Villafranca de Ordizia
 4th Overall Tour de l'Avenir
 6th Overall Setmana Catalana de Ciclisme
1970
 Volta a la Comunitat Valenciana
 1st Stages 1 & 7 
 2nd Overall Vuelta a los Valles Mineros
 1st Stage 1
 4th Overall Volta a Catalunya
 1st Stage 5 
 7th Overall Vuelta a España
 8th Overall Giro d'Italia
 1st Stage 12
1971
 1st  Overall Vuelta a Mallorca
 1st Stage 1 
 1st GP Navarra
 1st Stage 1 Vuelta a Asturias
 3rd Overall Tour of the Basque Country
 1st Stages 1, 2, & 4a 
 4th Road race, National Road Championships
 6th Trofeo Masferrer
 7th Overall Volta a Catalunya
1972
 1st  Setmana Catalana de Ciclisme
 1st Stages 1a & 4
 2nd Overall Vuelta a España
 1st Stages 1 & 14
 1st Stage 11 Giro d'Italia
 2nd GP Navarra
 4th Trofeo Masferrer
 5th Overall Paris–Nice
 5th Giro dell'Emilia
 7th Overall Vuelta a Andalucía
 7th Grand Prix des Nations
1973
 1st  Overall Vuelta a Mallorca
 1st Prologue 
 1st Klasika Primavera
 2nd Genoa–Nice
 3rd Overall Vuelta a Cantabria
 3rd Giro dell'Emilia
 5th Milano–Torino
 6th Giro di Lombardia
 7th Overall Volta a Catalunya
 9th Paris-Bruxelles
1974
 1st  Overall Tour of the Basque Country
 1st Stage 5 
 1st GP Navarra
 1st Clásica de Sabiñánigo
 1st Stage 2 Volta a Catalunya
 1st Stage 5 Vuelta a Asturias
 2nd Overall Vuelta a Mallorca
 1st Stage 1a 
 2nd Prueba Villafranca de Ordizia
 2nd GP Pascuas
 3rd Overall Vuelta a España
 4th Overall Critérium du Dauphiné Libéré
 4th Overall Setmana Catalana de Ciclisme
 6th Giro dell'Emilia
 7th Overall Vuelta a Andalucía
 7th Trofeo Masferrer
 9th Overall Paris–Nice
 9th La Flèche Wallonne
1975
 1st  Overall Vuelta a Asturias
 1st Stages 2, 5 & 6a 
 1st GP Pascuas
 3rd Overall Vuelta a España
 1st  Points classification
 1st Stages 2 & 7 (ITT)
 3rd Genoa–Nice
 4th Trofeo Masferrer
 5th Klasika Primavera
 6th Overall Tour of the Basque Country
 6th Overall Escalada a Montjuïc
 9th Overall Giro d'Italia
1976
 1st Stage 5b Tour de France
 2nd Overall Giro di Puglia
 2nd Road race, National Road Championships
 3rd Prueba Villafranca de Ordizia
 4th Giro del Lazio
 5th Overall Tour of the Basque Country
 6th Coppa Ugo Agostoni
 9th Giro di Toscana
1977
 1st Stage 4 Tour of the Basque Country
 1st Stage 3 Vuelta a Asturias
 2nd Overall Vuelta a España
 4th GP Navarra
 4th Prueba Villafranca de Ordizia
 5th Overall Vuelta a Cantabria
 6th Clásica de Sabiñánigo
 7th Overall Setmana Catalana de Ciclisme
 1st Stage 3 
 7th Overall Escalada a Montjuïc
 8th Road race, National Road Championships
 8th GP Pascuas
1978
 1st GP Navarra
 1st Prueba Villafranca de Ordizia
 1st Trofeo Masferrer 
 1st Stage 9 Tour de France
 2nd Overall Setmana Catalana de Ciclisme
 1st Stage 2 
 3rd Klasika Primavera
 6th Overall Volta a Catalunya
 1st Stage 2 
 6th Road race, National Road Championships
 8th Overall Tour of the Basque Country
1979
 1st Klasika Primavera
 1st Stage 18a Vuelta a España
 1st Stage 1 Vuelta a Asturias
 2nd Road race, National Road Championships
 2nd GP Navarra
 3rd GP Pascuas
 3rd Overall Tour of the Basque Country
 1st Stage 3 
 4th Overall Volta a la Comunitat Valenciana
 1st Stage 3 
 6th Overall Vuelta a Andalucía
1980
 2nd Overall Tour of the Basque Country
 2nd Road race, National Road Championships
 3rd GP Pascuas
 3rd GP Navarra
 9th Overall Vuelta a España
1981
 1st Stage 18 Giro d'Italia
 2nd GP Navarra
 9th Road race, National Road Championships
 10th Overall Vuelta a España
 1st Stage 17

Grand Tour general classification results timeline

References

External links

Official Tour de France results for Miguel María Lasa

1947 births
Living people
Cyclists from the Basque Country (autonomous community)
Spanish male cyclists
Olympic cyclists of Spain
Cyclists at the 1968 Summer Olympics
Spanish Giro d'Italia stage winners
Spanish Tour de France stage winners
Spanish Vuelta a España stage winners
People from Oiartzun
Sportspeople from Gipuzkoa